United is the 12th studio album by the Commodores, released on October 7, 1986 on Polydor Records.

Overview
The album reached number 17 on the Billboard Top R&B Albums chart. "Goin' to the Bank" and "Take It from Me" climbed to number two on Billboard's R&B singles charts. Another single, "United in Love," peaked at #22 on the Adult Contemporary chart.

Covers
The Commodores covered Peabo Bryson's "Let's Apologize" from his 1985 studio album Take No Prisoners.

Track listing

Personnel 
Commodores
 Walter Orange – drums, lead vocals (1, 2, 4, 5, 9, 10), backing vocals (4), arrangements (10)
 J.D. Nicholas – rap (1), lead vocals (2, 3, 4, 6-9), backing vocals (3, 4, 6)
 William King – keyboards, arrangements (7), BGV arrangements (7)
 Milan Williams – keyboards, arrangements (8), BGV arrangements (8)

Additional musicians
 Claude Gaudette – keyboards (1-4, 6), electronic programming (1-4, 6), arrangements (2, 3, 4, 6)
 Casey Young – special effects (1), keyboards (5, 9, 10), electronic programming (5, 9, 10)
 Greg Mathieson – keyboards (5, 10), arrangements (5, 9, 10)
 John Barnes – synthesizers (7, 8)
 Michael Boddicker – synthesizers (7, 8)
 Harold Hudson – synthesizers (7, 8), arrangements (7), BGV arrangements (7), backing vocals (7, 8)
 Sheldon Reynolds – guitars (1, 2, 6, 7, 8, 10), arrangements (2, 6), guitar synthesizer (6), backing vocals (6, 7, 8)
 Paul Jackson Jr. – guitars (3, 5, 9, 10)
 Dann Huff – guitars (4)
 Michael Thompson – guitars (9)
 Paulinho da Costa – percussion (5, 7, 8, 10)
 Isaac Morris – arrangements (6), drum overdubs (7)
 Gary Herbig – saxophone solo (10)
 James Anthony Carmichael – arrangements (7, 8)
 Siedah Garrett – backing vocals (1, 2, 3, 6), rap (1)
 Dennis Lambert – backing vocals (1, 2), BGV arrangements (1, 2, 3)
 Phil Perry – backing vocals (1, 2)
 Darryl Phinnessee – backing vocals (1, 2)
 Julia Tillman Waters – backing vocals (3, 9, 10)
 Maxine Willard Waters – backing vocals (3, 9, 10)
 Bill Champlin – backing vocals (5, 9, 10)
 Jason Scheff – backing vocals (9, 10)

Production 
 Dennis Lambert – producer (1-4, 6)
 Jeremy Smith – producer (1, 2, 6), recording (1, 2, 3, 6), mixing (1-4, 6)
 Greg Mathieson – producer (5, 9, 10)
 James Anthony Carmichael – producer (7, 8)
 Lloyd Tolbert – assistant producer (7, 8)
 Milan Williams – producer (8)
 Paul Ericksen – assistant engineer (1, 2, 6), mixing (3, 4), recording (4)
 Mick Guzauski – recording (5, 9, 10), mixing (5, 9, 10)
 Bino Espinoza – assistant engineer (5, 10)
 Don Murray – assistant engineer (5, 10)
 Calvin Harris – recording (7, 8), mixing (7, 8)
 Fred Law – additional recording (7, 8)
 Karen Siegel – assistant engineer (7, 8)
 Stephen Marcussen – mastering at Precision Lacquer (Los Angeles, California).
 Bill Levy – art direction 
 John Kosh – package design 
 Chris Callis – photography

References

Commodores albums
1986 albums
Polydor Records albums